Jon Tecedor Anguinaga (16 September 1975 in San Sebastián – 15 June 2008 in San Sebastián) was a Spanish male weightlifter, competing in the +105 kg category and representing Spain at international competitions. He participated in the 2000 Summer Olympics in the +105 kg event. He competed at world championships, most recently at the 1999 World Weightlifting Championships. Tecedor's best performance was at the 1998 World Championships, when he finished seventh in the +105 kg weight class. The Basque athlete, winner of several Spanish titles in different categories, qualified for the Olympics, but had to contend himself with 13th place there. Outside of weightlifting, Tecedor worked as an electrical engineer, and as an attendant in a paint store. En route to the 2008 Basque Weightlifting Championships, Jon Tecedor's motorcycle was struck by a car, and Tecedor was killed immediately.

Major results

References

External links
 

1975 births
2008 deaths
Spanish male weightlifters
Weightlifters at the 2000 Summer Olympics
Olympic weightlifters of Spain
People from San Sebastián
20th-century Spanish people